The Casuarina Island skink (Trachylepis casuarinae) is a species of skink found on Casuarina Island in Mozambique.

References

Endemic fauna of Mozambique
Trachylepis
Reptiles described in 1974
Taxa named by Donald George Broadley